Bianca Bosker is an American journalist and bestselling author. Her nonfiction book on sommelier training,  Cork Dork, was a New York Times bestseller. Her work has appeared in publications including The Wall Street Journal, Fast Company, The Atlantic, Food & Wine, The New York Times, Far Eastern Economic Review, and  The Oregonian.

Bosker is the author of Original Copies: Architectural Mimicry in Contemporary China. She is an alumna of Princeton University, and co-founder of the Huffington Post Technology section.

References

External links

Living people
Year of birth missing (living people)
Place of birth missing (living people)
American women novelists
21st-century American novelists
21st-century American women writers